Barreto may refer to:

 Barreto (surname)
 Barreto, Niterói, a neighborhood in Brazil
 Barreto River, in Pará, Brazil
 Pereira Barreto, a municipality in Brazil
 Barretos, a municipality in Brazil
 Barreto (footballer, born 1985), Paulo Vitor de Souza Barreto, Brazilian footballer
 Barreto (footballer, born 1995), Gustavo Bonatto Barreto, Brazilian football defensive midfielder